Masameer is a Saudi Arabian cartoon series developed by the studio Myrkott, a studio co-established in 2014 by Faisal Alamer, Abdulaziz Al-Muzaini, and Malik Nejer, with its head office in Riyadh. In 2020 the studio signed, with Netflix, a deal for exclusive distribution for a five year period.

It includes parody of Saudi societal issues. In 2017, Zahraa Alkhaisi of CNN wrote that the series was "satirical" and that the topics "would have been taboo until very recently."

The namesake is the area Masameer.

Masameer: The Movie was released for Netflix and earned about 7.5 million riyal. The second season of Masameer County premiered on March 2, 2023.

In 2021, the 'Masameer Experience', a Simworx dynamic media attraction based on the series, was opened at the BLVD Ruh City development in Saudi Arabia.

References

External links
 Myrkott Animation Studio 
 Myrkott official YouTube
 Masameer Classics - Netflix
 Masameer: The Movie - Netflix
 
 

Animated television series by Netflix
Saudi Arabian animated series
Arabic-language Netflix original programming
2010s animated television series
2020s animated television series